Zoran "Bata" Mirković (born 21 September 1971) is a retired Serbian footballer and current manager.

Playing career

Club career
Mirković made his first appearance for FK Rad during the 1990–91 season. But even before that he and his teammates won the Yugoslav title in the under-21 category, the biggest success Rad ever had. Mirković spent three seasons in Rad as a professional player, and all together played 62 matches, scoring one goal. His talent didn't go unnoticed by Partizan officials and they invited him to sign for Partizan. Mirković signed for Partizan and replaced the injured Blažo Pešikan.

In the first three years Mirković was with Partizan, he established himself as a player, became a first-choice player in the national team and won three titles (the double in 1993–94 followed by the league title in 1994–95. He wore the number 2 shirt and became a favourite of the Partizan fans because of his fighting spirit especially in derby matches against Red Star Belgrade. He was also a favourite because, in those difficult times (war and sanctions), he upheld his obligations towards Partizan and stayed for all three years stipulated in his contract. He played 82 matches for Partizan (26 in the 1993–94 season, 29 in the 1994–95 season and 27 in the 1995–96 season), scoring one goal.

Mirković spent two seasons with Atalanta. He got injured in the first match in Serie A league and had to take a three-month break. He played a role of midfielder/defender and his performance was so good that the then Juventus coach Marcello Lippi invited him to sign for Juventus. He was very popular among the Atalanta fans who were instrumental in convincing the club not to sell him to Fiorentina when that option seemed inevitable.

Mirković's career in Juventus can be divided in two different periods. Under coach Lippi, Bata played 19 Serie A matches, scoring one goal. He also played UEFA Champions League matches. When Carlo Ancelotti took over in the spring of 1999, Mirković was no longer a first-choice Juve player, playing mostly Italian Cup matches.

In summer 2000, Mirković signed a three-year contract with Fenerbahçe. In his first season in Istanbul he won a Turkish League title and was a finalist in Turkish Cup. In his second season in Turkey he played Champions League and came second in Turkish League. His third season in Fenerbahçe was not so successful. Three coaches and problems in the club caused Fenerbahçe to end the season in the sixth place.

Then in January 2004, following a 6-month break from football, Mirković became a Partizan player once again, signing a contract for two and a half years. On 6 March 2006, Mirković announced his retirement due to a recurring back injury at the age of 34.

International career
Mirković was a first choice player for the national team of FR Yugoslavia/Serbia and Montenegro where he usually played in the right-back position and wore the number 2 shirt. He played 59 matches with the senior national team. He was a participant in the 1998 FIFA World Cup in France but missed Euro 2000 because of a three-match ban following an incident in the last qualifying match, played against Croatia in Zagreb, where he grabbed Robert Jarni by the testicles and therefore was sent off.

Post-playing career

Administrative career
On 24 April 2007, Football Association of Serbia (FSS) appointed Mirković as sporting director of the national team, responsible for the A-squad and the under-21 squad. However, he quit by early December 2007, citing poor professional cooperation with the FSS leadership headed at the time by Zvezdan Terzić. FSS president Terzić (who would soon afterwards be indicted on embezzlement charges) commented on Mirković's resignation as follows: "Mirković is my mistake since I didn't know him well enough as a person before I brought him into the FSS. He's a wonderful person, but couldn't manage to be a part of the system and even said so on several occasions to both myself and general secretary Zoran Laković".

Mirković was chosen as the vice-president of FK Partizan on 18 August 2008. He was vice-president for about a year when he resigned after Partizan's early exit in the 2009–10 UEFA Champions League qualifying rounds.

Managerial career
Mirković began his managerial career as assistant coach of Sinđelić Belgrade in 2015 eventually being promoted to head coach in July 2015. He remained in that position until December 2015. In February 2016, he became the assistant coach of the Montenegrin national team where he worked directly with his former coach Ljubiša Tumbaković. He remained in that position until 4 August 2018 when he replaced Miroslav Đukić as head coach of Partizan. He was head coach of Partizan until abruptly resigning after a 1–0 loss to Voždovac on 10 March 2019.

Personal life
In May 2013, Mirković married Sanela Šaulić, daughter of singer Šaban Šaulić making Mirković the stepfather of Luka Adžić.

Career statistics

Club

International

Managerial

Honours
Partizan
 First League of FR Yugoslavia: 1993–94, 1995–96, 2004–05
 FR Yugoslavia Cup: 1993–94

Juventus
 UEFA Intertoto Cup: 1999

Fenerbahçe
 Süper Lig: 2000–01

Notes

References

External links

 Zoran Mirković at reprezentacija.rs
 Player Details at TFF

1971 births
Living people
Footballers from Belgrade
Yugoslav footballers
Serbia and Montenegro footballers
Serbian footballers
Association football defenders
Serbia and Montenegro international footballers
1998 FIFA World Cup players
FK Rad players
FK Partizan players
Atalanta B.C. players
Juventus F.C. players
Fenerbahçe S.K. footballers
Yugoslav First League players
Serie A players
Süper Lig players
Expatriate footballers in Italy
Expatriate footballers in Turkey
Serbia and Montenegro expatriate footballers
Serbia and Montenegro expatriate sportspeople in Italy
Serbia and Montenegro expatriate sportspeople in Turkey
Serbian football managers
FK Partizan managers
Serbian SuperLiga managers